The Argyle Secrets is a 1948 American film noir mystery thriller written and directed by Cy Endfield and starring William Gargan and Marjorie Lord. It was based on a half-hour radio play by Endfield, originally heard on CBS's Suspense. The film was made for the micro-budget of $100,000 and shot in eight days.

Plot
Reporter Harry Mitchell tracks down incriminating papers showing that some leading Americans collaborated with the Nazis during the war.

Cast

 Harry Mitchell - William Gargan
 Maria - Marjorie Lord	
 Lt. Samuel Sampson – Ralph Byrd	
 Panama Archie – Jack Reitzen
 Winter – John Banner	
 Elizabeth Court – Barbara Billingsley	
 Jor McBrod – Alex Frazer
 Scanlon – Peter Brocco	
 Allen Pierce – George Anderson	
 Gil Hobrey – Mickey Simpson	
 'Pinky' Pincus – Alvin Hammer	
 The Nurse – Carole Donne	
 Mrs. Rubin – Mary Tarcai	
 Melvyn Rubin – Cop – Robert Kellard	
 Gerald Rubin – Kenneth Greenwald

Critical reception
TV Guide called the film an "often exciting low-budget thriller." Variety called the film "a particularly interesting B movie in its suggestion that the U.S. government secretly brought Nazis into the country to work for the military."

Shown on the Turner Classic Movies show 'Noir Alley' with Eddie Muller on October 15, 2022.

References

External links
 
 The Argyle Secrets at Turner Classic Movies
 
 

1948 films
1948 mystery films
1940s English-language films
1940s mystery thriller films
American black-and-white films
American mystery thriller films
Film Classics films
Film noir
Films about journalists
Films based on radio series
Films directed by Cy Endfield
Films scored by Raoul Kraushaar
1940s American films